The Manhattan Handicap is an American Thoroughbred horse race raced annually at Belmont Park in Elmont, New York. It is named for Manhattan, the principal borough of the City of New York. Currently offering a purse of $1,000,000, the Grade I Manhattan Handicap is open to 4-year-olds & up, and is run on turf over the classic distance of  miles.

Inaugurated in 1867 at the now defunct Jerome Park Racetrack, it was there through 1894 when the racetrack closed. Moved in 1895 to Morris Park Racecourse in The Bronx, New York it remained there through 1904 when that racetrack also closed down. In 1905 the race was moved to Belmont Park. 

It was contested on dirt from inception through 1970, and again in 1977, 1979 and 1988. The race was hosted by Aqueduct Racetrack in 1959 and 1961, plus between 1963 and 1967.

In winning the 1964 edition of the Manhattan Handicap, Going Abroad time of 2:26.20 set a new North American speed record for 1 miles on dirt.

There was no race held in 1897 and 1909 to 1913. Large fields in 1971, 1972, 1975 and 1977 saw the race divided into two divisions.

Since 1994, the race has been run on the undercard of the final leg of the U.S. Triple Crown, the Belmont Stakes.

Over the years, the Manhattan Handicap has been set at a variety of distances:
 1867–1896, 1978 to present : 1 miles (10 furlongs)
 1898–1908 : six furlongs
 1914–1915 : seven furlongs
 1916–1932 : 1 mile
 1933–1958, 1960, 1962, 1963–1964, 1968–1969, 1977 : 
 1961 : 
 1959, 1965–1967 : 
 1970 to 1976 :

Records
Speed record:
1:57.79 @ 1 miles on turf – Paradise Creek (1994)
2:26.20 @ 1 miles on dirt - Going Abroad (1964)

Most wins:
 3 – Bolingbroke (1940, 1942, 1943)

Most wins by a jockey:
 5 – Jerry D. Bailey (1986, 1999, 2000, 2003, 2005)

Most wins by a trainer:
 8 – Chad C. Brown (2012, 2014, 2015, 2016, 2019, 2020, 2021, 2022)

Most wins by an owner:
 4 – Harry Payne Whitney (1907, 1908, 1926, 1928)
 4 – Townsend B. Martin (1940, 1942, 1943, 1945)
 4 – Greentree Stable (1944, 1950, 1962, 1972)

Winners

References

Grade 1 stakes races in the United States
Horse races in New York (state)
Turf races in the United States
Grade 1 turf stakes races in the United States
Open middle distance horse races
Belmont Park
Morris Park Racecourse
Recurring sporting events established in 1867
1867 establishments in New York (state)